Chantal Rossi is a politician in Montreal, Quebec, Canada. She has served on the Montreal city council since 2013 as a member of Équipe Denis Coderre pour Montréal. She was previously a borough councillor in Montréal-Nord from 2009 to 2013 and an elected trustee on the Commission scolaire de la Pointe-de-l'Île from 1998 to 2014.

Early life and career
Rossi was born in Montréal-Nord. She is the daughter of Carlo Rossi, who represented Bourassa in the House of Commons of Canada from 1979 to 1988. In 1987, she helped convince her father to reverse his long-standing support for capital punishment and to vote against its re-introduction.

A mother at a young age, Rossi worked for several years as a Bank of Montreal cashier before entering public life. She is a trained mezzo-soprano singer and has performed concerts in Montreal.

School commissioner
Rossi was first elected to the Commission scolaire de la Pointe-de-l'Île in 1998 and was re-elected in 2003 and 2007. She was not a candidate in the deferred election of 2014.

Borough councillor
Rossi was elected to the Montréal-Nord borough council in the 2009 Montreal municipal election as a Union Montreal candidate in Marie-Clarac. On council, she had special responsibility for culture and preparations for Montréal-Nord's centenary in 2015. She resigned from Union Montreal on February 21, 2013, after a corruption scandal implicated some of the party's leading members and joined Équipe Denis Coderre pour Montréal on June 17 of the same year.

City councillor
Rossi was elected to the Montreal city council for Marie-Clarac in the 2013 municipal election. Denis Coderre was elected as mayor and his party won a plurality of seats on council; on November 18, 2013, Coderre appointed Rossi as an associate councillor to the Montreal executive committee (i.e., the municipal cabinet) with responsibility for culture, heritage, and design. She worked in conjunction with Manon Gauthier, the executive councillor responsible for these files.

Rossi continues to serve on the Montréal-Nord borough council by virtue of holding her position on city council. When Gilles Deguire resigned as borough mayor amid scandal in January 2016, Rossi was appointed as his interim replacement. She served in this role until April 2016, when Christine Black was elected to the position in a by-election. During her tenure as mayor, the city of Montreal introduced a sculpture resembling a ferris wheel as an identifying beacon in one of Montréal-Nord's busiest thoroughfares. The sculpture prompted some criticism for its $1.1 million cost, although many defended it on the grounds that it added a "rare bit of positive recognition" for the frequently troubled region of the city. Rossi was quoted as saying, "It's clear that Montreal North has experienced a lot of pain [in recent years]. This helps to put a balm on that pain."

In the 2017 Montreal municipal election, Rossi ran as co-candidate for Coderre in the district of Ovide-Clermont. This means that if Coderre had been elected mayor and also city councillor for Ovide-Clermont, he would have sat as mayor and Rossi would have assumed the post of city councillor for Ovide-Clermont. Coderre won the city councillor election but lost the mayoral election; as he chose to resign from municipal politics, he exercised his option to cede the city council post to Rossi.

Electoral record

Municipal

School board

References

External links
City of Montreal biography (in French)

Living people
Canadian people of Italian descent
Montreal city councillors
Canadian mezzo-sopranos
People from Montréal-Nord
Quebec school board members
Year of birth missing (living people)
21st-century Canadian politicians
Women municipal councillors in Canada
21st-century Canadian women politicians